Alaa Hussein (born 10 January 1980) is an Iraqi actress, and visual artist. She is best known for her roles on the comedic show "Zaraq Waraq", which aired on Al-Sharqiyah since 2014.

Early life 
Hussein was born in Baghdad, She attended the University of Baghdad and received a bachelor's degree of Fine arts BFA, in 2005.

Filmography 

|
|-
|2019 - present
| Hamed Helou 
|Various
|}

References

External links
 
  on elcinema.com

Iraqi actresses
Iraqi actors
Iraqi film actresses
Iraqi television actresses
1980 births
21st-century Iraqi actresses
Living people
University of Baghdad alumni
People from Baghdad